The Bahau River is a river in North Kalimantan, Indonesia, about 1400 km northeast of the capital Jakarta.

The river is deemed a tributary of the Kayan River.

Geography
The river flows in the northeast area of Kalimantan with predominantly tropical rainforest climate (designated as Af in the Köppen-Geiger climate classification). The annual average temperature in the area is 20 °C. The warmest month is October, when the average temperature is around 22 °C, and the coldest is July, at 19 °C. The average annual rainfall is 3957 mm. The wettest month is September, with an average of 446 mm rainfall, and the driest is April, with 269 mm rainfall.

See also 
 List of rivers of Indonesia
List of rivers of Kalimantan

References 

Rivers of North Kalimantan
Rivers of Indonesia